Helcystogramma anthistis is a moth in the family Gelechiidae. It was described by Edward Meyrick in 1929. It is known from Sri Lanka.

The wingspan is about 8 mm. The forewings are orange with a narrow pale blue-metallic streak edged on both sides with dark fuscous along the costa from near the base to near the middle, thence bent obliquely down and continued wider more than halfway across wing. There is a blackish line near and parallel to the lower edge of this throughout, as well as a slender pale blue-metallic streak along and beneath the fold from the base to near the dorsum in the middle. There is also an incurved dark fuscous transverse line from the costa beyond the middle running to join the apex of the dark median line from the base. A straight pale violet-metallic transverse fascia is found at two-thirds, it is dark edged posteriorly and followed by an orange line. The remainder of the wing is suffused dark fuscous with an orange marginal line preceded by a series of small violet-metallic spots. The terminal edge is finely black. The hindwings are rather dark grey.

References

Moths described in 1929
anthistis
Moths of Asia